Aioi (Japanese: 相生) may refer to:

Places in Japan
Aioi, Tokushima (相生町 Aioi-chō), the former name of a town in Naka District, Tokushima
Aioi, Hyōgo (相生市 Aioi-shi)), a city in Hyōgo Prefecture
Aioi Bridge (相生橋 Aioi hashi), a "T"-shaped bridge in the center of Hiroshima

Train stations in Japan
 Aioi Station (Gifu), located in Gujō, Gifu Prefecture
 Aioi Station (Gunma), located in Kiryū, Gunma Prefecture
 Aioi Station (Hyōgo), located in Aioi, Hyōgo, Hyōgo Prefecture
 Nishi-Aioi Station, also located in Hyōgo Prefecture
 Sanuki-Aioi Station, located in Higashikagawa, Kagawa Prefecture

People
 Chieko Aioi (相生 千恵子), Japanese actress and voice actress
 Takahide Aioi (相生高秀), fighter pilot in the Imperial Japanese Navy (IJN) who subsequently became a commander of the Japan Maritime Self-Defense Force

Other
 Yūko Aioi (相生 祐子), a fictional character in the Japanese comedy manga Nichijou
 , a Japanese insurance company

Japanese-language surnames